Paul J. Wiedefeld (born August 19, 1955) is an American politician serving as the Maryland Secretary of Transportation under Governor Wes Moore since 2023. He was previously the general manager of Washington Metropolitan Area Transit Authority from 2015 to 2022, the chief executive officer of the Maryland Aviation Administration from 2002 to 2005 and from 2009 to 2015, and the administrator of the Maryland Transportation Administration from 2007 to 2009.

Early life and education
Wiedefeld grew up in the Govans neighborhood of Baltimore, where he graduated from Mount Saint Joseph High School before attending Towson University, where he received a Bachelor of Science degree in political science. Wiedefeld later graduated from Rutgers University in 1981 with a Master of Arts degree in city and regional planning.

Career
After graduating from Rutgers, Wiedefeld briefly worked as a planner in Morris County, New Jersey, before moving back to Baltimore. He began working for the Maryland Department of Transportation in 1986, where he played a leading role in managing dozens of transportation projects. From 1991 to 1994, he oversaw the department's Office of Systems Planning and Evaluation.

In 1994, Wiedefeld left the Maryland Department of Transportation to become the vice president of engineering and design firm Parsons Brinckerhoff. In April 2002, Governor Parris Glendening named Wiedefeld as the executive director of the Maryland Aviation Administration. While CEO, Wiedefeld oversaw the $1.8 billion expansion of Baltimore/Washington International Airport, which was one of the fastest-growing airports in the country at the time. In July 2005, Wiedefeld announced that he would be stepping down to work as the head of aviation consulting practice at Parsons Brinckerhoff.

In 2007, Governor Martin O'Malley named Wiedefeld as the administrator of the Maryland Transit Administration. In November 2008, he ordered the two-week shut down of the northern part of the Baltimore Light RailLink, citing a computerized braking system causing the trains' wheels to crack. In September 2009, Wiedefeld was named as the chief executive officer of the Maryland Aviation Administration, succeeding Timothy L. Campbell. In July 2015, Governor Larry Hogan announced that he would be replacing Wiedefeld with Ricky D. Smith, the head of Cleveland Hopkins International Airport.

WMATA General Manager

On November 5, 2015, the Washington Metropolitan Area Transit Authority announced that it would hire Wiedefeld as its next general manager following a year-long search. Wiedefeld took office on November 30, 2015. During his tenure, Wiedefeld sought to prioritize transit safety over rail service, believing it would restore public confidence in the transit system. He was also credited with overhauling the Metro's infrastructure while setting the stage for more-reliable and safer service in the future.

In March 2016, following a smoke incident near the McPherson Square station, Wiedefeld halted WMATA's operations for 24 hours to allow inspectors to search for dangerously deteriorated power cables. This was the first time that Metrorail had ordered a subway closure on a fair-weather workday. This closure was announced with very little public notice, disrupting the commute of thousands of D.C. residents. During the closure, Metro work crews found at least 26 power cables and connectors that required immediate repair.

In May 2016, Wiedefeld unveiled his "SafeTrack" initiative, a nine-month maintenance blitz that saw the transit line endure a series of rolling shutdowns and slowdowns in an effort to condense three years worth of rail maintenance into roughly one year. The "safety surges" ranged in duration, from seven days to 42 days, and included either around-the-clock single tracking or line-segment shutdowns. These disruptions, combined with continued chronic breakdowns, contributed to a 12 percent decrease in Metro ridership and added to the agency's financial problems, creating a projected $125 million revenue shortfall during fiscal year 2018. The SafeTrack program concluded in June 2017.

In July 2016, Wiedefeld proposed a permanent end to late-night weekend subway services, saying that the proposed cuts were "vital to the future health of the system". The proposed service hours cut was criticized by Metro riders, local legislators, and members of the WMATA board. In December 2016, the Metro Board voted to approve a two-year service cut to late-night train services. Wiedefeld proposed bringing back some late-night services in his 2020 budget proposal, but the proposed hour extensions were pushed back until 2021.

In November 2016, Wiedefeld launched the "Back2Good" initiative, a $400,000 marketing campaign aimed at winning back consumer trust through rail-car maintenance and station improvements. A Washington Post interview with WMATA riders a year following the initiative's launch found customers had mixed reactions on the state of the system, despite the improvements made to its trains.

Also in November 2016, Wiedefeld announced that the Metro would be doubling the number of new cars in service by 2017 while replacing its older cars, the 1000- and 4000-series, with the new 7000-series cars. In December 2021, following the derailing of a 7000-series car on the Blue Line, the Washington Metrorail Safety Commission ordered WMATA's 7000-series cars out of service. Wiedefeld defended the transit agency's rail car problems in a United States House Committee on Oversight and Accountability hearing on February 9, 2022.

In April 2017, Wiedefeld proposed privatizing station operations and track maintenance on the western stretch of the Silver Line as a means of saving money by relying more on outside contractors. This proposal was opposed by Amalgamated Transit Union Local 689, the Metro's largest union, which argued that privatization would be bad for riders and would cost the transit agency more in the long-run. In September 2018, the Metro began requesting proposals from private companies to perform maintenance and operations on the Silver Line extension. In December 2019, Wiedefeld announced a four-year labor contract with ATU Local 689 that would allow the transit agency to give up its strategy of privatization. The four-year contract was approved by the Metro Board on December 20.

On January 18, 2022, Wiedefeld announced that he would retire as the general manager of WMATA, effective July 18. On May 16, 2022, after WMATA announced that half of its train operators had lacked retraining and testing required for recertification, Wiedefeld announced that he would resign as general manager effective immediately, two months ahead of his scheduled retirement. In October 2022, Wiedefield joined HDR, Inc. as the director of the firm's transportation practice in the northeast United States.

Maryland Secretary of Transportation
On January 24, 2023, Governor Wes Moore named Wiedefeld as the Maryland Secretary of Transportation. His nomination was unanimously approved by the Maryland Senate on February 17.

Personal life
Wiedefeld and his wife have three children and live in Towson, Maryland.

References

External links

|-

|-

1955 births
Living people
20th-century American politicians
21st-century American politicians
American civil servants
People from Baltimore
People from Towson, Maryland
Rutgers University alumni
State cabinet secretaries of Maryland
Towson University alumni
Washington Metropolitan Area Transit Authority general managers